A game show host is an individual who manages a game show, introduces contestants, and asks quiz questions to test the knowledge of said contestants. They may also have other duties pertinent to production.

History 
In 1938, Freddie Grisewood was the first game show host.  He directed Spelling Bee, a fifteen-minute show that was broadcast in the United Kingdom over radio and television.

Characteristics 
Especially in the United States, game show hosts have generally been conservative or libertarian in their political beliefs. Reasons for this include many of the hosts' rural origins (early television personalities were expected to have natural General American English accents, which were most prominent in the Midwest) and the merit-based nature of the game show format.

World records 
In June 2014, Alex Trebek set a new world record for "hosting more episodes of a single television game show than anyone else in TV history".  Bob Barker previously held this record. In 2019, Pat Sajak became the longest-running host of any game show, defeating Barker’s previous record of 35 years hosting The Price Is Right.

See also 
 List of game show hosts

References 

Game shows